John Victor Parker (October 14, 1928 – July 14, 2014) was a United States district judge of the United States District Court for the Middle District of Louisiana.

Education and career
Born in Baton Rouge, Louisiana, Parker received a Bachelor of Arts degree from Louisiana State University in 1949 and a Juris Doctor from the Paul M. Hebert Law Center at Louisiana State University in 1952. He was in the United States Army from 1952 to 1954, remaining in the United States Army Reserve until 1964. He was in private practice in Baton Rouge from 1954 to 1979, also serving as an assistant parish attorney of the City of Baton Rouge in the Parish of East Baton Rouge, from 1956 to 1966.

Federal judicial service
On May 24, 1979, Parker was nominated by President Jimmy Carter to a new seat on the United States District Court for the Middle District of Louisiana created by 92 Stat. 1629. He was confirmed by the United States Senate on September 25, 1979, and received his commission on September 26, 1979. He served as Chief Judge from 1979 to 1998, assuming senior status on October 31, 1998, serving until his death on July 14, 2014, at his home in Baton Rouge.

References

Sources

External links

1928 births
2014 deaths
People from Baton Rouge, Louisiana
Baton Rouge Magnet High School alumni
Louisiana State University alumni
Louisiana State University Law Center alumni
Louisiana lawyers
Judges of the United States District Court for the Middle District of Louisiana
United States district court judges appointed by Jimmy Carter
20th-century American judges
United States Army officers
Louisiana Democrats
Methodists from Louisiana
United States Army reservists